Dale Edward Kildee (September 16, 1929 – October 13, 2021) was an American politician who served as U.S. Representative of Michigan from 1977 to 2013. He was a member of the Democratic Party.

His district included Flint, Saginaw and Bay City. In July 2011, Kildee announced he would retire after his term was up in 2012. He was succeeded by his nephew Dan Kildee.

Early life, education, and teaching career
Kildee was born in Flint, Michigan on September 16, 1929 to Timothy and Norma (Ullmer) Kildee. He was the fourth of five children. In his senior year of high school, he won the American Legion Medal of Citizenship. In 1947, Kildee received his high school diploma from St. Mary's High School.

He earned his B.A. from Sacred Heart Seminary in Detroit, Michigan in 1952. He earned a teacher's certificate from the University of Detroit in 1955. He did graduate work in history and political science at the University of Peshawar in Pakistan from 1958 to 1959 under a Rotary Foundation Fellowship. He earned an M.A. from the University of Michigan in 1961. He was a teacher at the University of Detroit Jesuit High School and Academy from 1954-56. Coming back in 1956 to Flint, Dale taught Latin until 1964.

Michigan legislature
Kildee served as a member of the Michigan State House of Representatives 81st district from 1965 to 1974. He then subsequently served as a member of the Michigan State Senate from 1975 to 1976.

U.S. House of Representatives

Elections

In 1976, incumbent Democratic U.S. Representative Donald Riegle resigned after being appointed to fill the vacant seat in the U.S. Senate caused by the death of Philip Hart. State Senator Kildee won the general election with 70% of the vote. He won re-election 17 times, each with at least 56% of the vote except in 1992, 1994, and 2010. In 1992, he defeated Megan O'Neill with 54% of the vote. He won Genesee County with 74%, while he lost the district's other two counties: Oakland and Lapeer. In the 1994 rematch, he defeated her with just 51% of the vote, the lowest winning percentage of his career. In 2010, he defeated Republican farmer and businessman John Kupiec with 53% of the vote. Kupiec won Tuscola County with 60%, while losing the district's other three counties. Kildee won Bay (49%), Saginaw (61%), and Genesee Counties (55%).

Tenure
In 1997, Kildee founded the House's Native American Caucus to advocate Native American issues. In 2010, Kildee revealed that he would be voting for the Senate version of the Health Care reform bill without the Stupak Amendment language restricting federal abortion funding. In addition, reports surfaced that he attempted to convince anti-abortion Democrats in the Stupak coalition to vote for the bill.

Committee assignments
He was a senior member of the House Committee on Education and the Workforce and served as ranking Democrat on the Subcommittee on Education Reform and a member of the Subcommittee on Employer-Employee Relations. He was also a member of the House Committee on Resources, where he sat on the Subcommittee on National Parks and Public Lands and the Subcommittee on Forests and Forest Health. From 1993 on, he served as co-chair of the Congressional Automotive Caucus. From 1997 on, he served as co-chair of the Native American Caucus.

Personal life
He met his future wife Gayle, a French teacher, while teaching at Central High School. They married in 1965 and had three children, Paul, Laura, and David. Both sons became army captains; their daughter became a commercial property manager.

In November 2011, Patrick Kildee, a second cousin of the congressman, accused Kildee of sexually abusing him more than 50 years previously when he was 12 years old. In response Kildee called the allegation untrue.

Kildee died on October 13, 2021, in Arlington, Virginia, at the age of 92.

Kildee was a Roman Catholic.

Electoral history

|+ : Results 1976–1990
! Year
!
! Democrat
! Votes
! %
!
! Republican
! Votes
! %
!
! Third Party
! Party
! Votes
! %
!
! Third Party
! Party
! Votes
! %
!
! Third Party
! Party
! Votes
! %
|-
|1976
||
| |Dale Kildee
| |124,260
| |70%
|
| |Robin Widgery
| |50,301
| |28%
|
| |Jimmy Sabin
| |American Independent
| |1,451
| |1%
|
||Max Duane
||U.S. Labor
||835
||0%
|
| |Benjamin Hoffman
| |Libertarian
| |735
| |0%
|-
|1978
||
| |Dale Kildee
| |105,402
| |77%
|
| |Gale Cronk
| |29,958
| |22%
|
| |Jimmy Sabin
| |American Independent
| |2,179
| |2%
|
|
|
|
|
|
|
|
|
|
|-
|1980
||
| |Dale Kildee
| |147,280
| |93%
|
| |No candidate
| |
| |
|
| |James Beaver
| |Libertarian
| |11,507
| |7%
|
|
|
|
|
|
|
|
|
|
|-
|1982
||
| |Dale Kildee
| |118,538
| |75%
|
| |George Darrah
| |36,303
| |23%
|
| |Dennis Berry
| |Libertarian
| align="right" |1,842
| align="right" |1%
|
|! style="background:#FF3300; "|David Freund
|! style="background:#FF3300; "|Workers League
|! style="background:#FF3300; "|568
|! style="background:#FF3300; "|0%
|
|
|
|
|
|-
|1984
||
| |Dale Kildee
| |145,070
| |93%
|
| |No candidate
| |
| |
|
| |Samuel Johnson
| |Independent
| align="right" |10,663
| align="right" |7%
|
|
|
|
|
|
|
|
|
|-
|1986
||
| |Dale Kildee
| |101,225
| |80%
|
| |Trudie Callihan
| |24,848
| |20%
|
| |Gene Schenk
| |Independent
| align="right" |1,099
| align="right" |1%
|
|
|
|
|
|
|
|
|
|
|-
|1988
||
| |Dale Kildee
| |150,832
| |76%
|
| |Kevin Cook
| |47,071
| |24%
|
|! style="background:#FF7796 "|Gary Walkowicz
|! style="background:#FF7796 "|Workers Against Concessions
|! style="background:#FF7796 "|1,174
|! style="background:#FF7796 "|1%
|
|
|
|
|
|
|
|
|
|
|-
|1990
||
| |Dale Kildee
| |90,307
| |68%
|
| |David Morrill
| |41,759
| |32%
|
|
|
|
|
|
|
|
|
|
|
|
|
|
|

|+ : Results 1992–2000
! Year
!
! Democrat
! Votes
! %
!
! Republican
! Votes
! %
!
! Third Party
! Party
! Votes
! %
!
! Third Party
! Party
! Votes
! %
!
! Third Party
! Party
! Votes
! %
|-
|1992
||
| |Dale Kildee
| |133,956
| |54%
|
| |Megan O'Neill
| |111,798
| |45%
|
|! style="background:#00bfff; "|Key Halverson
|! style="background:#00bfff; "|Natural Law
|! style="background:#00bfff; "|1,891
|! style="background:#00bfff; "|1%
|
|! style="background:#FF3300; "|Jerome White
|! style="background:#FF3300; "|Workers League
|! style="background:#FF3300; "|1,872
|! style="background:#FF3300; "|1%
|
|
|
|
|
|-
|1994
||
| |Dale Kildee
| |97,096
| |51%
|
| |Megan O'Neill
| |89,148
| |47%
|
|! style="background:#00bfff; "|Karen Blasdell
|! style="background:#00bfff; "|Natural Law
|! style="background:#00bfff; "|3,240
|! style="background:#00bfff; "|2%
|
|
|
|
|
|
|
|
|
|
|-
|1996
||
| |Dale Kildee
| |136,856
| |59%
|
| |Patrick Nowak
| |89,733
| |39%
|
| |Malcolm Johnson
| |Libertarian
| |3,472
| |2%
|
|! style="background:#00bfff; "|Terrence Shulman
|! style="background:#00bfff; "|Natural Law
|! style="background:#00bfff; "|1,127
|! style="background:#00bfff; "|0%
|
|
|
|
|
|-
|1998
||
| |Dale Kildee
| |105,457
| |56%
|
| |Tom McMillin
| |79,062
| |42%
|
| |Malcolm Johnson
| |Libertarian
| |4,006
| |2%
|
|
|
|
|
|
|
|
|
|
|-
|2000
||
| |Dale Kildee
| |158,184
| |61%
|
| |Grant Garrett
| |92,926
| |36%
|
| |Laurie Martin
| |Libertarian
| |5,337
| |2%
|
| |Terry Haines
| |U.S. Taxpayers
| |1,657
| |1%
|
|! style="background:#00bfff; "|Alaya Bouché
|! style="background:#00bfff; "|Natural Law
|! style="background:#00bfff; "|824
|! style="background:#00bfff; "|0%

|+ : Results 2002–2010
! Year
!
! Democrat
! Votes
! %
!
! Republican
! Votes
! %
!
! Third Party
! Party
! Votes
! %
!
! Third Party
! Party
! Votes
! %
!
|-
|2002
||
| |Dale Kildee
| |158,709
| |92%
|
| |	No candidate
| |
| |
|
| |Clint Foster
| |Libertarian
| align="right" |9,344
| align="right" |5%
|
| |Harley Mikkelson
| |Green
| |5,188
| |3%
|
|-
|2004
||
| |Dale Kildee
| |208,163
| |67%
|
| |Myrah Kirkwood
| |96,934
| |31%
|
| |Harley Mikkelson
| |Green
| |2,468
| |1%
|
| |Clint Foster
| |Libertarian
| align="right" |2,350
| align="right" |1%
|
|-
|2006
||
| |Dale Kildee
| |176,171
| |73%
|
| |Eric Klammer
| |60,967
| |25%
|
| |Ken Mathenia
| |Green
| |2,294
| |1%
|
| |Steve Samoranski
| |Libertarian
| |2,259
| |1%
|
|-
|2008
||
| |Dale Kildee
| |221,841
| |70%
|
| |Matt Sawicki
| |85,017
| |27%
|
| |Leonard Schwartz
| |Libertarian
| |4,293
| |1%
|
| |Ken Mathenia
| |Green
| |4,144
| |1%
|
|-
|2010
||
| |Dale Kildee
| |107,286
| |53%
|
| |John Kupiec
| |89,680
| |44%
|
| |J. Matthew de Heus
| |Green
| |2,649
| |1%
|
| |Michael Moon
| |Libertarian
| |2,648
| |1%
|

References

External links

Official U.S. House webpage
 

|-

|-

1929 births
2021 deaths
20th-century American politicians
21st-century American politicians
American expatriates in Pakistan
American Roman Catholics
Catholics from Michigan
Democratic Party members of the United States House of Representatives from Michigan
Democratic Party members of the Michigan House of Representatives
Democratic Party Michigan state senators
Politicians from Flint, Michigan
Schoolteachers from Michigan
University of Detroit Mercy alumni
University of Michigan alumni
University of Peshawar alumni
Members of Congress who became lobbyists